Adrian Younge (born May 7, 1978) is an American composer, arranger and music producer based in the Los Angeles area.

Background 
Younge grew up in Fontana, California. His father is a lawyer and Younge himself earned a Juris Doctor degree from the American College of Law in Orange County. Younge has worked as a lawyer and law professor—having taught entertainment law at his alma mater. Early in his career, Younge worked for the legal department of MTV.

Music career 
Younge edits and scores films. He played bass and keyboards in a band during the late 1990s, and began composing after sampling records with an MPC. He quickly learned to play several instruments and experimented with analog recordings which resulted in the Italian influenced Venice Dawn, which he released on EP. In 2009, his soundtrack for the film Black Dynamite was released on the Wax Poetics label. In 2011 Younge revived and expanded Venice Dawn into a longer work called Something about April. In 2013 he released Adrian Younge Presents the Delfonics and Twelve Reasons to Die  with Ghostface Killah. Younge also operates a vinyl record store in Los Angeles called Artform Studio. Younge, along with Ali Shaheed Muhammad of A Tribe Called Quest, produced Kendrick Lamar's "untitled 06" song featuring CeeLo Green, which was later reworked into the track "Questions" from the 2018 album The Midnight Hour. Younge and Ali also co-founded the Jazz Is Dead record label in 2017.

In 2021, Younge released the album The American Negro, as well as produced the podcast "Invisible Blackness". Both projects were launched during Black History Month and each seeks to highlight the systemic racism that African Americans have endured in the United States and the psychological toll that results. The podcast features speakers such as Chuck D, Ladybug Mecca, Keyon Harrold and Michael Jai White.

Discography
 2000:     Venice Dawn EP
 2009:     Black Dynamite (Score)
 2010:     "Passion" from Long Term 2 (Ab-Soul)
 2010:     "Don't Matter (Over There)" from Entrapment (Big Remo)
 2011:     Adrian Younge presents Venice Dawn:     Something about April
 2011:     "You're The One" from A Different World Mixtape (Phil Ade)
 2012:     Dark Soul Mix
 2012:     "Mandated Participants" from Mandatory Brunch Meetings (Mayhem Lauren)
 2012:     "Feszultseg" from Mennydorges (Barbarfiverek)
 2013:     Adrian Younge presents The Delfonics
 2013:     Adrian Younge presents Twelve Reasons to Die (Ghostface Killah)
 2013:     "Picasso Baby" and     "Heaven" from Magna Carta... Holy Grail     (Jay-Z)
 2013:     "The One" from Albert Einstein (Prodigy)
 2013:     "Demonology" from Gravitas     (Talib Kweli)
 2014:     Adrian Younge presents There is Only Now (Souls of Mischief)
 2014:     PRhyme (DJ Premier and     Royce Da 5'9")
 2014:     "Crushed Egos" and "Ruckus in B Minor" from A Better Tomorrow (Wu-Tang Clan)
 2014:     "7 Deadly Sins" and "Out on Bond" from Nobody's Smiling (Common)
 2014:     "Visual Camouflage" from In Death Reborn (Army of the Pharaohs)
 2015:     Adrian Younge presents Twelve Reasons to Die II (Ghostface Killah)
 2015:     In Another Life (Bilal)
 2015:     "Skipping Stones" from Ology     (Gallant and Jhene Aiko)
 2016:     "Prey'er" from Prey for the Devil (Bambu)
 2016:     "untitled 06 | 06.30.2014" from Untitled Unmastered (Kendrick Lamar)
 2016:     Something About April II
 2016:     The Electronique Void:     Black Noise (Jack Waterson)
 2016:     "JoHn Muir" from Blank Face LP     (Schoolboy Q)
 2016:     Luke Cage (Original Soundtrack Album) (with Ali Shaheed Muhammad)
 2016:     "I Changed My Mind"     (Adrian Younge Remix) (Lyrics Born)
 2016:     "Changeling II"     (Adrian Younge Remix) (DJ Shadow)
 2016:     "Keisha" from Kairi Chanel (Dave East)
 2016:     "Parade" from Halloween Havoc 3 (Lloyd Banks)
 2017:     "I Pray" from Friday On Elm St (Fabulous and Jadakiss)
 2017:     "Swear to God" from Plata O Plomo (Fat Joe and Remy Ma)
 2018:     “People Watchin’” from     September 2018 - EP (Mila J)
 2018:     "Love Is Love" from In Celebration of Us (Skyzoo)
 2018:     Adrian Younge Presents: Voices of Gemma (Rebecca Engelhart and Brooke deRosa)
 2018:     Luke Cage season 2 [Original Soundtrack Album] (with Ali Shaheed Muhammad)
 2018:     The Midnight Hour (with Ali Shaheed Muhammad)
 2019:     Adrian Younge Presents: Jack Waterson (with Jack Waterson)
 2020:     Jazz is Dead 001 (with Ali Shaheed Muhammad)
 2020:     Roy Ayres JID002 (with Roy Ayers and Ali Shaheed Muhammad)
 2020:     Marcos Valle JID003 (with Marcos Valle and Ali Shaheed Muhammad)
 2020:     Azymuth JID004 (with Azymuth and Ali Shaheed Muhammad)
 2020:     Doug Carn JID005 (with Doug Carn and Ali Shaheed Muhammad)
 2021:     The American Negro
 2021:     Gary Bartz JID006 (with Gary Bartz and Ali Shaheed Muhammad)
 2021:     João Donato JID007 (with João Donato and Ali Shaheed Muhammad)
 2021:     Brian Jackson JID008 (with Brian Jackson and Ali Shaheed Muhammad)
 2021:     Instrumentals JID009 (with Ali Shaheed Muhammad)
 2021:     Remixes JID010
 2022:     Jazz is Dead 011 (with Ali Shaheed Muhammad)
 2022:     Jean Carne JID012 (with Jean Carne and Ali Shaheed Muhammad)
 2022:     Katalyst JID013 (with Katalyst and Ali Shaheed Muhammad)
 2022:     Henry Franklin JID014 (Henry Franklin, Adrian Younge, and Ali Shaheed Muhammad)
 2022:     Garrett Saracho JID015 (with Garrett Saracho and Ali Shaheed Muhammad)

References

External links

1978 births
African-American film score composers
American film score composers
American film editors
American soul musicians
Living people
American male film score composers
Record producers from California
21st-century African-American people
20th-century African-American people